Wuxia Subdistrict is a subdistrict located in the eastern portion ofDongli District, Tianjin, China. It is located at the south of Junliangcheng Subdistrict, west of Huajiayuan Subdistrict, north of Gegu and Shuangheqiao Towns, and east of Jinqiao Subdistrict. As of 2010, the subdistrict has a population of 54,126.

History

Administrative divisions 
As of 2022, Wuxia Subdistrict administers the following five residential communities:

See also 

 List of township-level divisions of Tianjin

References 

Township-level divisions of Tianjin
Dongli District